Maurice Zundel  (Neuchâtel 21 January 1897, Ouchy (Lausanne) 10 August 1975) was a Swiss theologian.

Formation
Zundel completed his Doctor of Philosophy in 1927 at the Pontifical University of St. Thomas Aquinas, Angelicum with a dissertation directed by Reginald Garrigou-Lagrange entitled L'Influence du nominalisme sur la pensée chrétienne.

References

1897 births
1975 deaths
People from Neuchâtel
People from the canton of Neuchâtel
20th-century Swiss Roman Catholic theologians